Prudence is a virtue, the exercising of good judgment or wisdom in practical matters. The opposite is Imprudence.

Prudence may also refer to:
Herreshoff Prudence, an American sailboat design
Prudence (given name)
Prudent Investment
Prudence, West Virginia
Prudence Island, Narragansett Bay, Rhode Island
Prudence Building, Manhattan, New York
Prudence Millinery, a hatmaker
Convention of conservatism, also called prudence, a qualitative characteristic in accounting.

See also
Imprudence (Maupassant short story)